Strange Alliance is the debut album by Tommy Keene and was self-released on LP in 1982 on his Avenue Records label (catalog #AVE 001). Initially slated for release on Skip Groff's Limp Records, it still carries the Limp catalog number (LIMP 1010) in the run-out groove of the vinyl. Keene's band line-up would remain the same until he moved to Los Angeles following the release of his major label debut, Songs from the Film, in 1986. In addition, a former bandmate of bassist Ted Niceley's from Nightman, Mike Colburn (who had also been an early member of (The) Razz), contributes backing vocals on three songs.

In 2013, 12XU Records (run by Gerard Cosloy) reissued Strange Alliance on LP in a limited edition run with two bonus tracks not on the original release, "Nothing Is Gray" and "Stuck on a Ship".

Track listing
All songs written by Tommy Keene
"Landscape" – 3:40
"All the Way Around" – 4:32
"Don't Get Me Wrong" – 3:42
"I Can't See You Anymore" – 3:36
"It's All Happening Today" – 4:43
"Strange Alliance" – 4:25
"Another Night at Home" – 2:50
"Northern Lights" – 4:59

2013 reissue track listing:
"Landscape" – 3:40
"All the Way Around" – 4:32
"Nothing Is Gray" - 
"Don't Get Me Wrong" – 3:42
"I Can't See You Anymore" – 3:36
"It's All Happening Today" – 4:43
"Strange Alliance" – 4:25
"Stuck On A Ship" - 4:28
"Another Night at Home" – 2:50
"Northern Lights" – 4:59

Personnel

The band
Tommy Keene — Vocals, guitar, keyboards, "[a]ll instruments on "Northern Lights""
Ted Niceley — Bass guitar, percussion
Doug Tull — Drums
Michael Colburn — Harmony vocals ("Don't Get Me Wrong", "I Can't See You Anymore", "Another Night at Home")

Production
Ted Niceley — Producer
Tommy Keene — Producer
Jim Crenca — Engineer
Mark Greenhouse — Engineer
Robert Ludwig — Mastering

Additional credits
Recorded at Track Recorders, Silver Spring, Maryland
Mastered at Masterdisk
Roger G. Williams — Graphics design
Stephen Figliozzi — Photography
Skip Groff — Album coordinator
Peter C. Leeds — Manager (American Entertainment Management, New York City)
Seth Hurwitz — Booking
David Einstein — Liner notes

References

1982 debut albums
Tommy Keene albums
Albums produced by Ted Niceley